Heart Attack Man is an American punk rock band from Cleveland, Ohio.

History
Heart Attack Man released a demo in 2013. In 2014, the band released their first EP titled Acid Rain on Mayfly Records, On March 3, 2017, Heart Attack Man released their debut full-length album on Triple Crown Records titled The Manson Family. In 2018, Heart Attack Man released a split with fellow Ohio band McCafferty. Due to allegations against McCafferty's lead singer, Heart Attack Man would go on to remove McCafferty from the split. On April 19, 2019, Heart Attack Man released their sophomore album, Fake Blood, again through Triple Crown Records, alongside You Did This Records. In 2019 the band announced a tour alongside Boston Manor. In 2020 the band announced a tour with Chicago pop punk band Knuckle Puck. In 2021 the EP Thoughtz & Prayerz was released with a US tour with Neck Deep.

On March 9, 2022, the band embarked on their first headlining tour: Thoughtz & Prayerz Across North America, with 30 dates slated across the states and into Canada, with Covey, Arm's Length and Blood Root.

Band members

Current 
 Eric Egan (vocals, guitar)
 Adam Paduch (drums)
 Ty Sickels (guitar)

Former 
Seamus Groman (bass)
Logan McNeal (bass)

Discography
Studio Albums
The Manson Family (Triple Crown Records, 2017)
Fake Blood (You Did This Records, Triple Crown Records, 2019)

EPs
Demo (2013)
Acid Rain (2014)
Thoughtz & Prayerz (2021)
Splits
Heart Attack Man/McCafferty (Triple Crown Records, Take This To Heart Records, 2018)

References

Musical groups from Cleveland